Kal-Sheikh is an archaeological site in the Sahil region of Somaliland.

Overview
Kal-Sheikh is situated in the Sheikh District. The site features a number of caves adorned with rock art of animals and other figures. As no major archaeological excavation has been conducted here, the Kal-Sheikh paintings are of uncertain origin, purpose and date.

The Kal-Sheikh city and district are inhabited by people from the Deerayahan and Reer Sahal sub-divisions of the Issa Musa sub-clan of the Habar Awal.

See also
Sheikh, Somaliland
Somali architecture

Notes

Archaeological sites in Somaliland
Togdheer